The 142nd Delaware General Assembly was a meeting of the legislative branch of the state government, consisting of the Delaware Senate and the Delaware House of Representatives. Elections were held the first Tuesday after November 1 and terms began in Dover on the first Tuesday in January. This date was January 7, 2003, which was two weeks before the beginning of the third administrative year of Democratic Governor Ruth Ann Minner from Kent County and Democratic Lieutenant Governor John Carney from New Castle County.

Currently the distribution of seats for both houses was based on the first time the interpretation of the federal 2000 census. Therefore, it resulted in new district boundaries and elections for all the districts. It was ruled that the election districts would abandon county lines for their boundaries, but would design whatever district boundaries that would accomplish such population equals.

In the 142nd Delaware General Assembly session the Senate had a Democratic majority and the House had a Republican majority.

Party summary

Leadership

Members

Senate
About half the State Senators were elected every two years for a four-year term, except the decade district redesign year, when all served two years. They were designed for equal populations from all districts and its accomplishment occasionally included some territory from two counties.

House of Representative
All the State Representatives were elected every two years for a two-year term. They were designed for equal populations from all districts and its accomplishment occasionally included some territory from two counties.

References
The 2003-2004 Legislative Roster, Delaware State Chamber of Commerce, 2003

Places with more information
Delaware Historical Society; website; 505 North Market Street, Wilmington, Delaware 19801; (302) 655-7161
University of Delaware; Library website; 181 South College Avenue, Newark, Delaware 19717; (302) 831-2965

Delaware legislative sessions
2000s in Delaware